Rogues of the Turf is a 1923 British silent sports film directed by Wilfred Noy and starring Fred Groves, Olive Sloane and James Lindsay. The screenplay involves a plot to kidnap a race horse.

Cast
 Fred Groves as Bill Higgins  
 Olive Sloane as Marian Heathcote  
 James Lindsay as Capt. Clifton  
 Mavis Clair as Nellie Flaxman 
Bobbie Andrews as Arthur Somerton
 Clarence Blakiston as Sir George Venning  
 Dora Lennox as Rose  
 Nell Emerald as Nurse 
 James Reardon as Rogue

References

Bibliography
 Low, Rachael. The History of the British Film 1918-1929. George Allen & Unwin, 1971.

External links
 

1923 films
1923 crime films
1920s sports films
British crime films
British horse racing films
British silent feature films
Films directed by Wilfred Noy
British films based on plays
British black-and-white films
1920s English-language films
1920s British films
Silent crime films
Silent sports films